A Liljequist parhelion is a rare halo, an optical phenomenon in the form of a brightened spot on the parhelic circle approximately 150–160° from the sun; i.e., between the position of the 120° parhelion and the anthelion.

While the sun touches the horizon, a Liljequist parhelion is located approximately 160° from the sun and is about 10° long.  As the sun rises up to 30° the phenomenon gradually moves towards 150°, and as the sun reaches over 30° the optical effect vanishes.  The parhelia are caused by light rays passing through oriented plate crystals.  .

The phenomenon was first observed by Gösta Hjalmar Liljequist in 1951 at Maudheim, Antarctica during the Norwegian–British–Swedish Antarctic Expedition in 1949–1952.  It was then simulated by Dr. Eberhard Tränkle (1937–1997) and Robert Greenler in 1987 and theoretically explained by Walter Tape in 1994.

A theoretical and experimental investigation of the Liljequist parhelion caused by perfect hexagonal plate crystals showed that the azimuthal position of maximum intensity occurs at

,

where the refractive index  to use for the angle  of total internal reflection is Bravais' index for inclined rays, i.e.  for a solar elevation . The dispersion of ice causes a variation of this angle, leading to a blueish/cyan coloring close to this azimuthal coordinate. The halo ends towards the anthelion at an angle 

.

See also 
 Sun dog

References

External links 
 A fish eye photo by Günter Röttler, Hagen, September 1983 featuring a parhelic circle with a 120° parhelion and a Liljequist parhelion.
 List of observations (pick Liljequist parhelia as a halo filter.)

Atmospheric optical phenomena